A picture dictionary or pictorial dictionary is a dictionary where the definition of a word is displayed in the form of a drawing or photograph. Picture dictionaries are useful in a variety of teaching environments, such as teaching a young child about their native language, or instructing older students in a foreign language, such as in the Culturally Authentic Pictorial Lexicon. Picture dictionaries are often organized by topic instead of being an alphabetic list of words, and almost always include only a small corpus of words.

A similar but distinct concept is the visual dictionary, which is composed of a series of large, labelled images, allowing the user to find the name of a specific component of a larger object.

See also

Visual dictionary
Knowledge visualization
Visual thinking

External links

Visual Dictionary Online
Visual Dictionary Online with more than 2400 language combinations

Early childhood education
Language education
Dictionaries by type